The Central District of Yazd County is in Yazd province, Iran. At the National Census in 2006, its population was 499,808 in 134,300 households. The following census in 2011 counted 564,125 people in 163,681 households. At the latest census in 2016, the district had 635,687 inhabitants in 189,293 households.

References 

Yazd County

Districts of Yazd Province

Populated places in Yazd Province

Populated places in Yazd County